Music & Me is the second studio album by American singer and rapper Nate Dogg, released by Elektra Records in 2001. It received a fair amount of critical and commercial success upon release. Its popularity was led by the hit single "I Got Love" which appeared on the soundtrack to the Jason Statham film The Transporter, and reached number 48 on the Billboard Hot 100 chart. It features guest appearances from Dr. Dre, Xzibit, Kurupt, Fabolous, Ludacris, Pharoahe Monch, Snoop Dogg, Tha Eastsidaz, Jermaine Dupri, B.R.E.T.T., and Lil' Mo, and includes production by Bink!, Dr. Dre, Mel-Man, Battlecat, Damizza, Fredwreck Nassar, Mike City, Bryan Michael-Cox, and Megahertz. According to SoundScan, Music & Me has sold 400,000 copies to date.

Critical reception

Wise Q of HipHopDX gave praise to the production contributions by Dr. Dre and Mike City, and the guest lyrics from Xzibit and Ludacris, concluding that "There aren't many tracks that show Nate's enthusiasm dropping but the numerous features question whether the Dogg can hold it solo. Doesn't matter. Right now, the number one crooner from the West (not TQ) is back and this album displays Nate in all his pimp daddy vocalising glory." AllMusic's Jason Birchmeier also commended the production and featured artists for making the record have banging sound quality but felt the songwriting throughout lacked substance to avoid being "lyrically artless", concluding that "Nonetheless, Nate Dogg is vocally in fine form on Music & Me, an album that sounds good when it's playing, and fans will surely enjoy much of the album, which admittedly has been a long time coming, so long as they're not expecting anything deep or meaningful." Steve 'Flash' Juon of RapReviews gave note that the album shines when the solo tracks and featured songs follow the "Regulate" formula but said there was few of them to be found, concluding that "[F]or Nate Dogg fans his vocals are still quality and the beats are choicer than most, but hip-hop heads who expect rapper + Nate may actually find the reverse is less than they expect, rather than being equivalent."

Track listing

Bonus tracks only available in Special Edition

Charts

Weekly charts

Year-end charts

Singles chart positions

References

2001 albums
Nate Dogg albums
Elektra Records albums
Albums produced by Battlecat (producer)
Albums produced by Bink (record producer)
Albums produced by Bryan-Michael Cox
Albums produced by Dr. Dre
Albums produced by Fredwreck
Albums produced by Jermaine Dupri